Dalane is a traditional district in the southwestern part of Norway, consisting of the municipalities of Lund, Sokndal, Eigersund, and Bjerkreim. Dalane is one of the 15 districts in Western Norway.  It sits to the southeast of the very flat Jæren region and south of the moorland of Ryfylke.  The  district has about 24,159 residents (as of 2014).

Dalane has a distinctive hilly, rugged, often treeless, bare, rocky land. There are numerous rivers and lakes, some of which are quite large. The rocky soil is very thin and is of poor quality compared to the fertile farmland in Jæren. The coastline is largely unprotected by any islands. The uplands of Dalane are often used for sheep grazing. Geographically, the southern part of Hå municipality fits with the landscape of Dalane, but that municipality is usually grouped with Jæren.

The largest urban areas in Dalane are the town of Egersund and the villages of Moi in Lund, Hauge in Sokndal, and Vikeså in Bjerkreim. These four areas hold about 70% of the area's population (2013).   There are also scattered settlements along the coast and in the large valleys inland.

References

 

Districts of Rogaland
Bjerkreim
Eigersund
Sokndal
Lund, Norway